Mr. Big may refer to:

Entertainment

In film and literature
 Mister Big (James Bond), a villain in the novel and film Live and Let Die
 Mister Big (1943 film), a 1943 musical 
 Mr. Big (2007 film), a 2007 documentary

In television
 Mr. Big, a character on the 1970s TVOntario children's television series Math Patrol
 Mr Big, a 1977 BBC TV sitcom written by and starring Peter Jones
 Mr. Big (Sex and the City), a character from the Sex and the City television series and movie
 Mr. Big, pseudonym used by Hank Hill in the King of the Hill episode "Soldier of Misfortune"
 Mr. Big, a recurring villain on the PBS Kids animated series WordGirl
 Mr. Big, the boss of Fearless Leader, who is Boris and Natasha's boss, on the Rocky and Bullwinkle Show
 "Mr. Big" (Get Smart), an episode of the TV series Get Smart

In video games
 Mr. Big (Art of Fighting), a character originally from the Art of Fighting video game series
 Mr. Big, the main villain from the motion picture and video game Michael Jackson's Moonwalker
 Mr. Big, a villain from the video game Narc

Music
 Mr. Big (American band), an American hard rock band
 Mr Big (British band), a British pop rock band
 Mr. Big (Mr. Big album), the debut album of the American band
 Mr. Big (Little Richard album)
 Mr. Big (Big Boy album), 1993
 "Mr. Big", a song by Free from their album Fire and Water, later covered by Mr. Big the American band

Criminology
 Mr. Big, a nickname for the New Zealand heroin trafficker and murderer Terrance John Clark
 Mr. Big, nickname of English mobster and businessman Paul Massey
 Mr. Big, a nickname of American crime boss Arnold Rothstein
 Mr Big (criminology), a slang term for a highly ranked person within an organised crime organisation
 Mr. Big (police procedure), a Canadian method used by undercover police to obtain confessions from cold cases

Other uses
 Mr. Big (chocolate bar), a brand of chocolate bar
 Mr Big, the name of the balloon involved in the 2012 Carterton hot air balloon crash in New Zealand

See also
 Big (disambiguation)
 Mr Bigg's, a fast food chain in Ghana and Nigeria
 Ronald Isley (born 1941), American soul singer occasionally known as "Mr. Biggs"